Kosmos 2514 ( meaning Space 2514) is a  Russian military satellite launched in 2016 as part of the GLONASS satellite navigation system.

This satellite is a GLONASS-M satellite, also known as Uragan-M, and is numbered Uragan-M No. 751.

Kosmos 2514 was launched from Site 43/4  at Plesetsk Cosmodrome in northern Russia. A Soyuz-2-1b carrier rocket with a Fregat upper stage was used to perform the launch which took place at 00:21 UTC on 7 February 2016. The launch successfully placed the satellite into a Medium Earth orbit. It subsequently received its Kosmos designation, and the international designator 2016-008A. The United States Space Command assigned it the Satellite Catalog Number 41330.

The satellite is in orbital plane 3, in orbital slot 17. As of March 2016 it remains in operation.

See also

 2016 in spaceflight
 List of Kosmos satellites (2501–2750)
 List of R-7 launches (2015–19)

References

Spacecraft launched in 2016
Spacecraft launched by Soyuz-2 rockets
Kosmos satellites
2016 in Russia
GLONASS satellites